Roberto Ríos (born 14 August 1957) is a Puerto Rican basketball player. He competed in the men's tournament at the 1988 Summer Olympics.

References

1957 births
Living people
Puerto Rican men's basketball players
Olympic basketball players of Puerto Rico
Basketball players at the 1988 Summer Olympics
Place of birth missing (living people)